Azopardo Airport ,  is an airstrip serving the Timaukel commune in the Magallanes Region of Chile.

The airstrip is at the eastern end of the Almirantazgo Fjord, a fjord off the Strait of Magellan. The runway is alongside the Azopardo River, and there is mountainous terrain in all quadrants.

See also

Transport in Chile
List of airports in Chile

References

External links
OpenStreetMap - Azopardo
OurAirports - Azopardo
SkyVector - Azopardo
Bing Maps - Azopardo Airport

Airports in Tierra del Fuego Province, Chile